Free is a surname. Notable people with the surname include:

Ana Free (born 1987), Portuguese musician
Ann Cottrell Free (1916–2004), American journalist
Arthur M. Free (1879–1953), American politician
Chandra Free (born 1981), American comic book writer and artist
Doug Free (born 1984), American football offensive tackle
Duncan Free (born 1973), Australian rower and Olympic medalist
Edgar Free (1872–1938), Australian politician
Edward Drax Free (1764–1843), English clergyman
Ernest Free (1867–1946), Australian cricketer
F. William Free (1928–2003), American advertising executive
Gavin Free (born 1988), English filmmaker
Helen Murray Free (1923–2021), American chemist and educator
James S. Free (1908–1996), American journalist
Kalyn Free, American attorney
Karl R. Free (1903–1947), American artist and curator 
Lloyd A. Free (1908–1996), American pollster
Marcella Free (1920–2007), American copywriter
Micki Free, American guitarist
Nell Tiger Free (born 1999), An English Actress
Peter Free (born 1971), Australian cricketer
Ray D. Free (1910–2002), American major general and Utah House of Representatives member
Ross Free (born 1943), Australian politician
Steve Free (born 1950), American musician
Tony Free, Australian rules football player
Travon Free, American comedian, actor, television writer, and former basketball player
World B. Free (born Lloyd Bernard Free, 1953), American basketball player